Margarito González Manzanares (born 3 March 1979) is a Mexican football defender.

Career
González made his professional debut with Reboceros de la Piedad in 2001. Although he has not been playing because of joaquin Beltran's experience he was once called for the national soccer team in Mexico. According to FIFA, he is the Mexican soccer player with the hardest kick in soccer history. In 2012 Gonzalez took time off due to depression, after making a free kick hitting Cruz Azul's defender Marco Bueno, and leaving him in the hospital for five months. Margarito went back to play with Querétaro FC.

Honours

Club
Irapuato
Liga de Ascenso:
Winners:   Clausura 2011

External links

1979 births
Living people
Mexican footballers
Mexico under-20 international footballers
Association football defenders
Irapuato F.C. footballers
Querétaro F.C. footballers
Cruz Azul footballers
Liga MX players
Ascenso MX players
Liga de Balompié Mexicano players
Footballers from Guerrero